Faber Towers is a twin tower skyscraper in Taman Desa, Seputeh, Kuala Lumpur, Malaysia. It is one of the earliest skyscrapers completed in the city.
After changed the majority of its ownership, Faber Towers has undergone massive refurbishment work and the work has been completed in the 3rd quarter of 2015.
The refurbished twin tower with 18-storey office towers and a podium block consisting of 3 level of retail lots is among the tallest structures in Taman Desa.

References

External links
 Official website 

Skyscraper office buildings in Kuala Lumpur
Office buildings completed in 1986
1986 establishments in Malaysia
Twin towers
20th-century architecture in Malaysia